Edward Devlin Connachan (27 August 1935 – 28 January 2021) was a Scottish footballer, who played as a goalkeeper for Dunfermline Athletic, Middlesbrough, Falkirk, East London Celtic and the Scotland national team.

Connachan joined Dunfermline from Dalkeith Thistle in May 1957 and went on to play 172 games for Dunfermline. He helped the club win the Scottish Cup for the first time in 1961 in what was to become known as "Connachan's Cup Final" as he made save after save from the Celtic forwards and he earned two caps for Scotland, against Czechoslovakia in November 1961 and Hungary in May 1962. He also earned selection in the Scottish League representative side.

Connachan joined Middlesbrough in August 1963 for £5,500, returning to Scotland with Falkirk in November 1966. His final port of call was South Africa, where he played for East London Celtic before retiring. He still resided in the African state.

In March 2007 Connachan was inducted into Dunfermline Athletic's Hall of Fame. 

Connachan died in January 2021, aged 85.

References

External links
 Profile at Dunfermline Athletic official website
 

1935 births
2021 deaths
Dunfermline Athletic F.C. players
Falkirk F.C. players
Association football goalkeepers
Middlesbrough F.C. players
People from Prestonpans
Scotland international footballers
Scottish Football League players
Scottish footballers
Scottish Football League representative players
Footballers from East Lothian
Dalkeith Thistle F.C. players
Scottish Junior Football Association players
Scottish expatriate footballers
Expatriate soccer players in South Africa
East London United F.C. players
Port Elizabeth City F.C. players
Scottish expatriate sportspeople in South Africa
Place of death missing